Schwartz Cove is an ice-filled cove of Abbot Ice Shelf located west of Williamson Peninsula on the south side of Thurston Island. Trice Islands lie at the cove entrance. Named by Advisory Committee on Antarctic Names (US-ACAN) after Commander Isidor J. Schwartz, Executive Officer of the seaplane tender USS Pine Island in the Eastern Group of U.S. Navy Operation Highjump, 1946–47.

Maps
 Thurston Island – Jones Mountains. 1:500000 Antarctica Sketch Map. US Geological Survey, 1967.
 Antarctic Digital Database (ADD). Scale 1:250000 topographic map of Antarctica. Scientific Committee on Antarctic Research (SCAR), 1993–2016.

References

Coves of Antarctica
Bodies of water of Ellsworth Land